Dyer Ball (June 3, 1796 – March 27, 1866) was an American missionary and medical doctor in China. Born in West Boylston, Massachusetts, Dyer Ball studied at Phillips Academy and at Yale College for two years. He graduated from Union College, New York, in 1826, and then studied Theology at Yale and Andover Theological Seminary. He received his licence to preach in 1828, one year after marrying Lucy Mills.  After being ordained in 1831, Dyer Ball became an agent of the American Home Missionary Society in 1833, and settled in Florida, where he taught, among other places, at St. Augustine High School there, and among the local African-American community. Meanwhile, as his appointment to a mission abroad was delayed due to financial circumstances, he also received a medical degree from a medical institution in Charleston, South Carolina, in 1837, and learned Chinese.

He was sent to Singapore by the American Board of Commissioners for Foreign Missions on 25 May 1838, and remained there until 1841, when he departed for Macao due to his wife's ailing health.  He then moved to Hong Kong in 1843, where his wife died, and to Guangdong (Canton Province) in 1845, where he settled permanently. In1846, he married Isabella Robertson, a missionary from Scotland.  Their son, James Dyer Ball, became Deputy Registrar of the Supreme Court in Hong Kong.  His daughter from his first marriage, Elizabeth, became a missionary and was married to Andrew P. Happer in 1847.

His work focused mainly on performing missionary work and preaching. He ran a boys' school and opened a publishing house, where he published Chinese literature, religious tracts and a popular Chinese almanac. He also used his medical experience to help the local population.

Dyer Ball died in Guangdong in 1866. He is buried at the Mission Cemetery in Lianzhou.

References

Alexander Wylie, ''Memorials of Protestant Missionaries to the Chinese:Giving a List of their Publications and Obituary Notices of the Deceased, p108-109 American Presbyterian Mission Press, Shanghai 1867

Protestant missionaries in China
1796 births
1866 deaths
People from West Boylston, Massachusetts
Phillips Academy alumni
Union College (New York) alumni
American Protestant missionaries
Christian medical missionaries
American expatriates in China
Yale Divinity School alumni